Czechoslovakia sent a delegation to compete at the 1984 Winter Paralympics, in Innsbruck, Austria.

Czechoslovakia did not win any medals.

Classification
Each event had separate standing, sitting, or visually impaired classifications:

LW2 - standing: single leg amputation above the knee
LW 3 - standing: double leg amputation below the knee, mild cerebral palsy, or equivalent impairment
LW4 - standing: single leg amputation below the knee
LW5/7 - standing: double arm amputation
LW6/8 - standing: single arm amputation
LW9 - standing: amputation or equivalent impairment of one arm and one leg
B1 - visually impaired: no functional vision
B2 - visually impaired: up to ca 3-5% functional vision

Alpine skiing

Women

Men

See also
Czechoslovakia at the 1984 Winter Olympics
Czechoslovakia at the Paralympics

References

 

 

Athlete Search Results - TCH - 1984PWG, International Paralympic Committee (IPC)

Nations at the 1984 Winter Paralympics
1984
Paralympics